The abbreviation TRH can refer to

 Thyrotropin-releasing hormone
 Their Royal Highnesses, style when referring to several royals